Wormed is a Spanish technical death metal band. The group formed in 1998 in Madrid and are known for their sci-fi and space influenced imagery, lyrics and sound. The band has released three full-length albums to date.

History
In the beginning, the first line-up was: J. Oliver (guitar), Dani (guitar), Guillemoth (bass), Andy C. (drums). After a few months the band contacted with Phlegeton the official vocalist of Wormed. Phlegeton gives fresh air to the band transforming the band concept from the classical gore to another concept, based in the outer space far from imagination. The music turned into an atypical death metal full of diverse influences.

In December 1999, the first MCD demo was recorded, Floating Cadaver in the Monochrome, with the collaboration of Tana Avulsed as sound engineer. This MCD had a great welcome in the underground scene, selling more than 1500 copies all over the world. There are actually three different editions of the MCD, with different CD layer design.

In 2001, the band returned to the studio to record a Promo-CD, Voxel Mitosis, including a single song, due to the lack of resources. Despite this, the sound is more professional than the MCD. After the recording the promo-CD, Dani left Wormed, because the lack of compromise with the band. Wormed became a 4 members band being: Phlegeton (vocals), J. Oliver (guitar), Guillemoth (bass) and Andy C. (drums). The band received international recognition playing in some festivals and concerts worldwide, giving the band a name in the local and international scene, with a great response of the underground audience.

In 2003, the band released their first full album Planisphaerium, through Macabre Mementos Recs. (Japan), including 7 tracks, recorded in VST Studios from Madrid.

In December 2003, J. Oliver left the band, so Wormed looked for a replacement to J. Oliver, they found Charly, guitar player from Wormineye, a death metal band from Valencia.

In 2004–2006, the band played in international metal festivals in USA, Japan, Germany, Holland; and they made a Japan tour with Goratory (USA) and Vomit Remnants (Japan), later they made another tour with Malignancy (USA) and Despondency (Germany) around Europe.

After a period of inactivity, the band started writing again with J.Oliver and this time with Phlegeton at the drums. Later they recruited Migueloud of the Spanish death metal band Human Mincer as the second guitarist. In 2010 the band released the single Quasineutrality through the Spanish label Pathologically Explicit Recordings and soon after in 2012 they released the album Planisphaerium and the single Quasineutrality was edited through the North American label Willowtip Records including bonus tracks and re-mastered audio by Delta314 Sound Studio.

Considering the possibility of start playing live again, the band decided to recruit a new drummer, Ricardo Mena, Riky (from the Spanish death metal band Avulsed).

In March 2013 their new album Exodromos was released. The album was recorded at Sadman Studios in Madrid by Carlos Santos and mastered by Mika Jussila (Amorphis, Impaled Nazarene, Children of Bodom, Nightwish, etc.) at the famous Finnvox Studios, Helsinki, Finland. Exodromos is released through Willowtip Records in USA and Hammerheart Records in Europe.

Lyrically, Exodromos is a prequel of Planisphaerium; the story tells about futuristic science concepts and chaotic visions of the last human left in cosmos, Krighsu. These are particularly in relation to the awakening of the "Chrym" once the last humans of the year 8K, called the Terrax, disappeared, and the known universe was absorbed by a quantum wormhole in an inverted multi-vectorial reionization. Krighsu, will travel through xenoverses to found a new world with the human seed.

Wormed released a statement on 13 March 2018 that their drummer Guillermo Calero had died, with the cause of death not being disclosed. Calero played in Wormed from 2014 until his death and performed on their third full-length album Krighsu (which was released on 16 March 2016).

After recruiting a new drummer (Gabriel Valcázar), Wormed released a new EP, Metaportal, in 2019. In 2020, Loudwire considered Wormed the best metal band from Spain of all time.

Band members

Current members
J.L. "Phlegeton" Rey – vocals (1998–present)
Guille Garcia – bass (1998–present)
Miguel Ángel – guitar (2008–present)
Gabriel Valcázar – drums (2018–present)

Former members
Dani – guitar (1998–2001)
Javier Oliver – guitar (1998–2003, 2007–2016)
Andrés "Andy" Cobos – drums (1998–2008)
Charly R. – guitar (2003–2008)
Ricardo "Riky" Mena – drums (2009–2013)
Guillermo "G-Calero" Calero – drums (2014–2018; died 2018)

Timeline

Discography

Albums
 Planisphærium (2003)
 Exodromos (2013)
 Krighsu (2016)

Other releases
 Floating Cadaver in the Monochrome (demo, 1999)
 Voxel Mitosis (demo single, 2001)
 Quasineutrality (single/EP, 2010)
 Metaportal (EP, 2019)

Music videos
 "Tautochrone" from the album Exodromos (2013)
  "Computronium Pulsar Nanarchy" from the album Krighsu (2016)

References

External links
 
 Wormed at Bandcamp
 Willowtip Records

Spanish death metal musical groups
Technical death metal musical groups
Musical groups established in 1998
Musical quintets
Season of Mist artists
Musical groups from Madrid